is a Japanese director of animated films.

Biography
What started Hara on his career as an animation creator was visiting an animation film company as part of his job hunting activities after graduating from Tokyo Designer Gakuin College (TDG).  He recklessly left the tour, an act normally forbidden for visitors, and then begged an artistic director to give him a job. A few days later he returned with some continuity drawings he created, as requested.  As a result, he was introduced to a commercial film studio.

After working at the studio for eighteen months, he joined Shin-Ei Animation on the recommendation of the president Keijiro Kurokawa.  At Shin-Ei he began working on a TV series Kaibutsu-kun as a production manager, then was moved to Doraemon. There for the first time he took on the role of animation director. In working on Doraemon, he was influenced by the chief director Tsutomu Shibayama. Since Hara admired Fujiko Fujio, Doraemon'''s original author, he worked hard and became known for improving quality. He appeared in an animation magazine as a new director to look out for.   After Obake no Q Taro and Doraemon, he was chosen as chief director of Esper Mami and worked for this TV series for two and a half years. When Esper Mami ended, he took a break for ten months.  Then he returned by working on 21 emon. After 21 emon, he worked on Crayon Shin-chan.  For "Shin-chan" he did direction and continuity both for the TV series and the movies, becoming director in October 1996.  The 2001 Crayon Shin-chan movie Crayon Shin-chan: The Storm Called: The Adult Empire Strikes Back earned critical praise, and raised his profile.  The following year's Crayon Shin-chan: The Storm Called: The Battle of the Warring States was commended by the Agency for Cultural Affairs.

As of 2012 Hara has begun shooting his first live-action film, Hajimari no Michi'', which was released in June, 2013.

Television
1983-1986: Doraemon (ドラえもん) Direction/Storyboard
1987-1989: Esper Mami (エスパー魔実) Director/Direction/Storyboard/Screenplay
1989: Chimpui (チンプイ) Director
1989: 21-emon (21エモン) Storyboard
1992-2004: Crayon Shin-chan (クレヨンしんちゃん) Director/Direction/Storyboard/Screenplay

Filmography
March 17, 1984: Doraemon: Nobita's Great Adventure into the Underworld (のび太の魔界大冒険) Direction
March 16, 1985: Doraemon: Nobita's Little Star Wars (のび太の宇宙小戦争) Direction
March 15, 1986: Doraemon: Nobita and the Steel Troops (のび太と鉄人兵団) Direction
March 14, 1987: Doraemon: Nobita and the Knights of Dinosaurs  (のび太と竜の騎士) Direction
March 9, 1991: Dorami-chan: Wow, The Kid Gang of Bandits (アララ少年山賊団!) Director
March 6, 1993: Dorami-chan: Hello, Dynosis Kids!! (ハロー恐竜キッズ!!) Director
July 24, 1993: Crayon Shin-chan: Action Kamen vs Leotard Devil (クレヨンしんちゃん アクション仮面VSハイグレ魔王) Direction/Storyboard/screenplay
April 23, 1994: Crayon Shin-chan: The Secret Treasure of Buri Buri Kingdom  (クレヨンしんちゃん ブリブリ王国の秘宝) Direction/Storyboard/screenplay
April 15, 1995: Crayon Shin-chan: Unkokusai's Ambition (クレヨンしんちゃん 雲黒斎の野望) Direction/Storyboard/screenplay
April 13, 1996: Crayon Shin-chan: Adventure in Henderland (クレヨンしんちゃん ヘンダーランドの大冒険) Direction/Storyboard/screenplay
April 19, 1997: Crayon Shin-chan: Pursuit of the Balls of Darkness (クレヨンしんちゃん 暗黒タマタマ大追跡) Director/Direction/Storyboard/screenplay
April 18, 1998: Crayon Shin-chan: Blitzkrieg! Pig's Hoof's Secret Mission (クレヨンしんちゃん 電撃!ブタのヒヅメ大作戦) Director/Direction/Storyboard/screenplay
April 17, 1999: Crayon Shin-chan: Explosion! The Hot Spring's Feel Good Final Battle/Kureshin Paradise! Made in Saitama (クレヨンしんちゃん 爆発!温泉わくわく大決戦 / クレしんパラダイス!メイド・イン・埼玉) Director/Direction/Storyboard/screenplay
April 22, 2000: Crayon Shin-chan: The Storm Called The Jungle  (クレヨンしんちゃん 嵐を呼ぶジャングル) Director/Direction/Storyboard/screenplay
April 21, 2001: Crayon Shin-chan: The Storm Called: The Adult Empire Strikes Back (クレヨンしんちゃん 嵐を呼ぶ モーレツ!オトナ帝国の逆襲) Director/Direction/Storyboard/screenplay
April 20, 2002: Crayon Shin-chan: The Storm Called: The Battle of the Warring States (クレヨンしんちゃん 嵐を呼ぶ アッパレ!戦国大合戦) Director/Direction/Storyboard/screenplay
April 19, 2003: Crayon Shin-chan: The Storm Called: Yakiniku Road of Honor (クレヨンしんちゃん 嵐を呼ぶ 栄光のヤキニクロード) Direction/Storyboard/screenplay
April 17, 2004: Crayon Shin-chan: The Storm Called: The Kasukabe Boys of the Evening Sun (クレヨンしんちゃん 嵐を呼ぶ!夕陽のカスカベボーイズ) Direction/Storyboard
April 16, 2005: Crayon Shin-chan: The Legend Called Buri Buri 3 Minutes Charge (クレヨンしんちゃん 伝説を呼ぶブリブリ 3分ポッキリ大進撃) Storyboard
July 28, 2007: Summer Days with Coo (河童のクゥと夏休み) Director/Direction/Storyboard/Screenplay
August 21, 2010: Colorful (カラフル) Director
June 1, 2013: Hajimari no Michi (はじまりのみち) Director/screenplay
May 9, 2015: Miss Hokusai (百日紅) Director
April 26, 2019: Birthday Wonderland (バースデー・ワンダーランド) Director
December 23, 2022: Lonely Castle in the Mirror (かがみの孤城) Director

Honours
Medal with Purple Ribbon (2018)

References

External links 
 Media arts meister Keiichi Hara(Japanese)
 
 

1959 births
Anime directors
Japanese animators
Living people
People from Gunma Prefecture
Recipients of the Medal with Purple Ribbon